Kim Bo-yoon (born December 18, 2001) is a South Korean actress. She is known for her roles in dramas such as Good Casting, Ms. Hammurabi, At Eighteen and All of Us Are Dead. She also appeared in movies The Battleship Island, Mr. Go, Love, Lies and Familyhood.

Filmography

Film

Television series

Web shows

References

External links 
 

2001 births
Living people
People from Namyangju
21st-century South Korean actresses
South Korean television actresses
South Korean film actresses